Montijo Air Base  - officially known as Air Base No. 6 (Base Aérea n.º 6) or BA6 - is a military air base located in Montijo, Portugal. The base is home to three transport squadrons and one helicopter search and rescue squadron and provides logistic support to the Portuguese Navy's helicopters based there.

History

The Montijo Air Base started to be built by the Portuguese Navy, before World War II, to replace its Naval Aviation base of Bom Sucesso in Lisbon. The War prevented the good progress of the works and the base ended only to be inaugurated in 1952, as the "Sacadura Cabral" Naval Aviation Centre.

The inauguration of the base happened during the process of the creation of the independent Portuguese Air Force (PoAF) and the transference of the Naval Aviation from the control of the Navy to the new branch.

On March 3, 1953, the Naval Aviation Centre was officially re-designated as Air Base No. 6. However, within the PoAF an independent group originating from the Naval Aviation units, known as "Forças Aeronavais", continued to operate from BA6 in the anti-submarine role. Only by late 1956, early 1957, was the integration of these units in the PoAF complete, with some personnel returning to the Navy and others staying in the air force.

In 1993, with the arrival of the Portuguese Navy's first Westland Super Lynx Mk.95 for the Vasco da Gama-class frigates, the air base became home to a naval helicopter squadron.

The Air Force Survival Training Center (CTSFA) is based at BA6 with the mission of training PoAF personnel in survival and individual rescue, including in nuclear, radiologic, biological or chemical warfare environments, as well Explosive Ordnance Disposal.

In 2018 it was announced that the base would also become a civil airport (serving Lisbon) for low cost carriers by 2022.

Tenant units
 Portuguese Air Force
 501 Sqn. "Bisontes" (Bisons) — tactical transport squadron
 502 Sqn. "Elefantes" (Elephants) — tactical and general transport squadron
 504 Sqn. "Linces" (Lynxes) — VIP and MEDEVAC transport squadron
 751 Sqn. "Pumas" (Pumas) — search and rescue squadron
 Portuguese Navy
 Esquadrilha de Helicópteros da Marinha (Navy Helicopter Squadron)

See also
 List of airports in Portugal
 Portuguese Air Force
 Portuguese Naval Aviation
 Field Firing Range of Alcochete

References

Notes

Sources

External links
 Base Aérea Nº 6 – Força Aérea Portuguesa
 

Airports in Portugal
Military installations in Portugal
Portuguese Air Force bases
Buildings and structures in Setúbal District
Montijo, Portugal
Military of Portugal